Yoo Ji-tae (born April 13, 1976) is a South Korean actor, film director and screenwriter. After a stint as a fashion model, Yoo launched his acting career in 1998 then rose to fame through the films Attack the Gas Station (1999) and Ditto (2000). In the succeeding years, he gained acting recognition by working with acclaimed directors such as Hur Jin-ho in One Fine Spring Day (2001), Park Chan-wook in Oldboy (2003), and Hong Sang-soo in Woman is the Future of Man (2004). Yoo began directing short films in 2003, which were well received in the film festival circuit. His feature directorial debut Mai Ratima was released in 2013.

Career 
Yoo Ji-tae began his career as a fashion model, and he walked the runway for the Seoul Fashion Artist Association collections in 1995. Then in 2000, with a series of hit films and widely seen TV appearances, Yoo was more constantly in the limelight than any other actor, and in a very short time, rose to become a major actor in Korean film.

His first brush with fame came in the role of "Paint" in his second feature, the 1999 hit Attack the Gas Station. His sensitive and artistic image in this film and the warm character he displayed as a guest on TV talk shows helped to propel him to stardom. With the surprise success of his third film Ditto in spring 2000, Yoo's star status was secured. He also appeared in the successful firefighting film Libera Me. In this early part of his career, he was known particularly for the wild colors that he would dye his hair (white in Attack the Gas Station, blue in Ditto, blonde in Libera Me).

In 2001, however, he dyed his hair black and took on a more subdued, serious role in Hur Jin-ho's One Fine Spring Day. Although it wasn't a big hit with audiences, his performance in this film opened many critics' eyes and drew widespread praise, while officially launching the second stage of his career.

For the next two years, Yoo didn't appear in any new films, because Natural City took an unusually long time to progress from shooting to a commercial release. He then appeared in three works in 2003: Natural City (which bombed, despite its big budget and special effects), the horror/suspense film Into the Mirror, and Park Chan-wook's acclaimed Oldboy. Yoo's memorable role in the latter film as a wealthy eccentric fixated on revenge would make his face well known to international audiences.

Yoo has stated that he believes Oldboy to be an original Korean story.

As Yoo's career established itself he began to appear in many high-profile projects, such as in well-known arthouse director Hong Sang-soo's Woman is the Future of Man (which, like Oldboy, screened at Cannes in 2004); Yim Pil-sung's big-budget Antarctic Journal, shot in New Zealand; and the action/noir Running Wild with Kwon Sang-woo. He also established his own production company Yoo Movie in 2005.

As soon as he finished shooting the 2007 period film Hwang Jin-yi about a Joseon-era gisaeng, Yoo chose to act in the play Come to the Ghost House. A graduate of Dankook University with a major in Theater and Film, he also established a theater to put on one play a year. Almost all the money for the theatrical productions comes from his own wallet. "I work on stage because it's there that I find the challenge and the stimulus an actor needs through continuous creative work," he said.

Yoo returned to the screen with 2008 romantic drama film, Hello, Schoolgirl, based on the manhwa Soonjeong Manhwa.

In 2009, he lent his voice as narrator for the track "I’m Sorry" (미안해) in singer Jinju's album Pearlfect.

Yoo then returned to the melodrama genre, starring in his first TV drama Star's Lover opposite Choi Ji-woo, as well as a couple of romance-themed films, notably Secret Love which reunited him with Oldboy costar Yoon Jin-seo. Afterwards he played another villain in the real-time suspense thriller Midnight FM.

After getting his master's degree in 2008 from Chung-Ang University's Graduate School of Advanced Imaging Science, Multimedia & Film, in recent years Yoo has focused more on his passion for directing. To him, "Making films is like taking drugs. Actors feel a pleasure when they deliver well but directors feel they have poured out everything they have in the sole fact that they have completed a movie. It's impossible to compare the pleasure you get from it." He has helmed a number of award-winning short films that have screened in festivals around the world. In addition to directing his fourth short film Invitation, Yoo wrote the script and plays the main character alongside leading lady Uhm Ji-won.

In 2012, Yoo directed his first feature film Mai Ratima, based on a synopsis he wrote 15 years ago in college. It portrays the unlikely love affair of a Korean man in his 30s living on the bottom rung of society and a mail-order bride from Thailand in her 20s. Shooting began in Gyeonggi Province on January 26, 2012, and it premiered at the Busan International Film Festival on October 5, 2012. Yoo said he plans to continue producing or directing movies based on strong social issues as he is interested in the plight of the less privileged. Mai Ratima won the Jury Prize at the 2013 Deauville Asian Film Festival.

He then co-starred with Kōichi Satō and Vincent Gallo in Junji Sakamoto's 2013 suspense thriller Human Trust.

For the biopic The Tenor - Lirico Spinto, Yoo practiced singing for four hours every day for more than a year, and took private English and Japanese lessons to portray Bae Jae-chul, an internationally acclaimed tenor who loses his voice to thyroid cancer. Afterwards, he starred in another TV series Healer, written by Song Ji-na.

In 2016, Yoo starred in the bowling-themed film, Split. He returned to television in the South Korean remake of The Good Wife.

In 2017, Yoo starred in The Swindlers along with Hyun Bin. The movie is about a prosecutor who plans to catch a con man who has swindled a large sum of money. The same year, he was cast in the Danish film The House That Jack Built by Lars Von Trier. He also had a starring role in the crime drama, Mad Dog.

In January 2018, Yoo signed with new management agency BH Entertainment.

In 2019, Yoo is set to star in the espionage melodrama Different Dreams.

In 2020, Yoo starred in the melodrama When My Love Blooms.

Personal life

Early life 
Yoo was raised by a single parent. "My mother, who worked as a nurse for a long time, wants to run a hospital for the elderly someday. I want to financially help her realize her dream, and then establish an orphanage," said Yoo. He is friends with comedian Kim Joon-ho, having lived together as roommates during college and briefly acting together onstage.

Currently a student at the Catholic University of Korea Graduate School of Social Work, Yoo is very active in philanthropic efforts. He joins charity photo shoots and auctions, has helped set up a kindergarten in Nepal, has donated to Haiti earthquake relief, has donated funds for building schools in Myanmar, has joined a charity photo shoot to benefit victims of facial burns, has volunteered in a campaign to deliver free lunches to underprivileged people, has promoted the adoption of abandoned dogs, and has campaigned against domestic violence towards migrant wives. His advocacies are World Vision, Compassion Korea, DAIL Community, Social Welfare Society Inc., YWCA of Korea, Nanum House of Sharing and Korean Association of Cinematheques.

Relationships and married 
Yoo first met actress Kim Hyo-jin in 2003 when they were models for a clothing brand, and the two became friends after continuously meeting in photo shoots. Their romantic relationship began in 2006, and they were among the very few Korean star couples who openly admitted their dating status. They announced their engagement in August 2011, and subsequently released pre-wedding photos. Their minimalist invitation was made from environmentally friendly paper and had the number 1,825 written on it, the exact number of days the two had spent together as a couple. They were married at the Shilla Hotel in Seoul on December 2, 2011. The wedding date marked the couple's fifth anniversary together and was booked by Yoo one year in advance despite landing on a Friday – an unusual day for a wedding. The ceremony was officiated by the president of World Vision Korea; Yoo and Kim are the organization's honorary ambassadors, and they donated a portion of their monetary wedding gifts to World Vision to help build a primary and middle school in Myanmar. Their first child, a son, was born on July 5, 2014. They welcomed their second son on April 15, 2019.

Philanthropy 
On March 8, 2022, Yoo donated 10 million won to the Hope Bridge Disaster Relief Association to help the victims of the massive wildfire that started in Uljin, Gyeongbuk and has spread to Samcheok, Gangwon.

On May 16, 2022, Yoo donated 10 million won to the 9th Wildflower Film Awards.

Filmography

As actor

Film

Television series

Web series

As filmmaker

Theater 
 Ha-il  (2004)
 Six Out of Six  (2005)
 Come to the Ghost House...  (2007)

Other activities 
2006 28th Clermont-Ferrand International Short Film Festival - Jury 
2007 9th Short Shorts Film Festival & Asia - Jury 
2008 4th Jecheon International Music & Film Festival - Jury 
2009 14th Busan International Film Festival - Jury 
2009 22nd Tokyo International Film Festival - Jury 
2011 3rd DMZ International Documentary Film Festival - Co-festival director

Awards and nominations

References

External links 
 
 
 

 
 

1976 births
Living people
20th-century South Korean male actors
21st-century South Korean male actors
South Korean male television actors
South Korean male film actors
South Korean film directors
South Korean screenwriters
South Korean male stage actors
South Korean male models
Catholic University of Korea alumni
Chung-Ang University alumni
Dankook University alumni
Gangneung Yoo clan